George Youds (1872–1937) was an English footballer who played at left-back. He played 53 league games in the English Football League for Burslem Port Vale.

Career
Youds, a potters turner, joined Burslem Port Vale from Kettering Town in November 1892. He played twice in 1892–93, the club's first season in the English Football League. He featured 23 times in 1893–94, helping the club to seventh in the Second Division. He played 33 of Vale's 34 games in 1895–96, after which the club failed re-election and were demoted to the Midland League. He played a total of 56 league games before being leaving the Athletic Ground sometime in 1897. After retiring, he became an electric turner, and married a woman called Betsy Fairbanks, settling at 3 Lorne Street.

Career statistics
Source:

References

1872 births
1937 deaths
Sportspeople from Burslem
Association football fullbacks
English footballers
Kettering Town F.C. players
Port Vale F.C. players
English Football League players